Edge of Dawn is a German futurepop band consisting of Mario Schumacher and Frank M. Spinath (also a member of Seabound). Schumacher founded the band as a solo project in 1998. Spinath joined the project as vocalist in 2005.  The duo's debut release, also in 2005, was the EP The Flight [Lux]. This was followed by two releases in 2007: the full-length Enjoy the Fall, which achieved the number three position on the German Alternative Chart in June 2007 and the EP Borderline Black Heart. Edge of Dawn's second studio album Anything That Gets You Through The Night was released May 21, 2010. In between releases, Edge of Dawn has contributed both original tracks and remixes to several Dependent compilations.

The name "Edge of Dawn" is an homage to the Covenant song with the same name.

Discography

Studio albums
Enjoy the Fall (2007) Metropolis Records
Anything That Gets You Through The Night (2010) Metropolis Records

EPs
The Flight (Lux) (2005) Metropolis Records
Borderline Black Heart (2007) Metropolis Records
Stage Fright (2010) Metropolis Records

Other releases 
Love Lost (2015) VA Dependence compilation

References

External links
Official site
Edge Of Dawn Allmusic 
Edge of Dawn Discogs
Edge of Dawn Myspace
Band bio by Metropolis Records, Band bio by Dependent Records

German synthpop groups
Metropolis Records artists
Dependent Records artists